Wang Chunmei (born 10 April 1976) is a retired Chinese long-distance runner who specialized in the 5000 metres.

Her personal best time was 15:07.16 minutes, achieved in July 1998 in Rome. She also had 3:59.48 minutes in the 1500 metres, achieved in October 1997 in Shanghai.

Achievements

References

1976 births
Living people
Chinese female long-distance runners
Athletes (track and field) at the 1998 Asian Games
Asian Games competitors for China